An anime adaptation of Hetalia: Axis Powers was announced on July 24, 2008. It is directed by Bob Shirohata (Gravitation, Diamond Daydreams) and is animated by Studio Deen. It was originally scheduled for broadcast on Kids Station on January 24, 2009 but was later canceled. The cancellation only affected the Kids Stations broadcast; plans to make the series available through mobile phone and Internet streaming were not affected. Controversies arose when numerous Korean protesters called for the cancellation of the series, claiming that the personification of the character Korea was an insulting representation of Koreans, despite there being no plans to include the character. Kids Station claimed that the Korea character does not appear in the anime and that it was "unaware of the criticism in Korea," and cited "various circumstances" as being behind the decision to cancel its airing of the anime, but they did not provide further information as to the nature of these circumstances. The character for Korea can still be seen in the ending of the anime while all of the countries are rotating around the world.

A second 26-episode season of Hetalia: Axis Powers was announced on April 16, 2009, and a third was announced on December 10, 2009.  For the third and fourth seasons of the anime, the title was changed to Hetalia: World Series. The fifth season, Hetalia: A Beautiful World, was announced in Gentosha's September 2012 issue. As of the 1st of April, a sixth season had been confirmed. This season was called "The World Twinkle," and aired in 2015.
Episodes are available on mobile phone and Internet streaming for a period of eight days each; the Internet streaming period begins three days after the episode is first available on mobile phone.  Dates given are the first day an episode is available on mobile phone.  An original net anime (ONA) adaptation of the Hetalia: World Stars side story manga was announced in October 2020.  It premiered on April 1, 2021.

Episode list

Season 1 (Axis Powers Season 1)

Season 2 (Axis Powers Season 2)

Season 3 (World Series Season 1)

Season 4 (World Series Season 2)

Season 5 (Beautiful World series)

Season 6 (The World Twinkle series)

Season 7 (World Stars Series)

Compilation episodes

Extra episodes

World Series

Beautiful World

World Twinkle

World Stars

Movies

References

This article uses material from the "List of Axis Powers Hetalia episodes" article and is licensed under the Creative Commons Attribution-Share Alike License.

Hetalia: Axis Powers
Articles with imported Creative Commons Attribution-ShareAlike 3.0 text